Paweł Kołodziej (born 24 September 1980 in Krynica-Zdrój, Poland) is a Polish professional boxer, fighting in the cruiserweight and Heavyweight division. Kołodziej is the current IBF Inter-Continental Cruiserweight champion. Kołodziej won the belt against Giulian Ilie of Romania.

Career
Kołodziej is a former IBC (International Boxing Council) champion. The Polish cruiserweight won the vacant title in July 2009 in Ruda Śląska, Poland. Then,  by unanimous decision over Czech Roman Kracik. The Pole successfully defended the belt in December 2009 in Łódź, defeating an American journeyman Rob Calloway by RTD in the sixth round of the bout. Previously, in 2006, Kołodziej won the WBC Youth belt and defended the title three times until 2008.

Kołodziej vs Calloway

"The fight against Calloway will be a test of my means. I respect his experience but I believe that if I box wisely and take advantage of my height, I will leave the ring as a winner" said 1.95m tall Kołodziej before the most difficult battle in his professional career. The 40-year-old rival's record was quite impressive – 70 victories (including 57 knockouts) and 10 defeats. However, the '84 born Pole managed to stop the experienced Rob Calloway at MOSiR hall in Łódź and defended his IBC belt.

Kołodziej floored Calloway with a powerful straight right as early as at the finish of the first round. The second one was also firmly won by “Harnaś” who bombarded his extraordinarily experienced rival with series of punches. 40-year-old American found himself on the canvas for a second time in the round three. Kołodziej had no mercy also in the fifth part of the battle, dropping “All-American Prizefighter” twice. After the sixth round, Calloway’s corner reasonably decided to stop this uneven bout.

"I approached this fight very seriously, I was a bit nervous. I am content with the victory but I didn’t do everything I had planned. Sometimes I let him go too far" Kołodziej modestly said while being interviewed by Bokser.org after the clash. "I got a bit irritated that I couldn’t emphasise my victory. If he had fought the next round, I would certainly have knocked him out.".

Kołodziej vs Krence

Originally, the 29-year-old Kołodziej had to defend his IBC title in the upcoming bout but the decision was changed a few days before the bout. - World Boxing Foundation (WBFo) is more active and dynamic than IBC, so when the opportunity of the championship fight occurred, we decided to take it without thinking – explained Andrzej Wasilewski, the promising Pole's promoter.

Professional Record

|-
|align="center" colspan=8|34 Wins (19 knockouts), 1 Loss, 0 Draw
|-
|align=center style="border-style: none none solid solid; background: #e3e3e3"|Result
|align=center style="border-style: none none solid solid; background: #e3e3e3"|Record
|align=center style="border-style: none none solid solid; background: #e3e3e3"|Opponent
|align=center style="border-style: none none solid solid; background: #e3e3e3"|Type
|align=center style="border-style: none none solid solid; background: #e3e3e3"|Round
|align=center style="border-style: none none solid solid; background: #e3e3e3"|Date
|align=center style="border-style: none none solid solid; background: #e3e3e3"|Location
|align=center style="border-style: none none solid solid; background: #e3e3e3"|Notes
|-align=center
|Win
|34-1
|align=left| Wladimir Letr
|
|
|
|align=left|
|align=left|
|-align=center
|Loss
|33–1
|align=left| Denis Lebedev
|
|
|
|align=left|
|align=left|
|-align=center
|Win
|33–0
|align=left| Prince Anthony Ikeji
|
|
|
| align=left|
|align=left|
|-align=center
|Win
|32–0
|align=left| Cesar David Crenz
|
|
|
| align=left|
|align=left|
|-align=center
|Win
|31–0
|align=left| Richard Hall
|
|
|
| align=left|
|align=left|
|-align=center
|Win
|30–0
|align=left| Giulian Ilie
|
|
|
| align=left|
|align=left|
|-align=center
|Win
|29–0
|align=left| Mauro Adrian Ordiales
|
|
|
| align=left|
|align=left|
|-align=center
|Win
|28–0
|align=left| Felix Cora Jr.
|
|
|
| align=left|
|align=left|
|-align=center
|Win
|27–0
|align=left| John McClain
|
|
|
| align=left|
|align=left|
|-align=center
|Win
|26–0
|align=left| Parfait Amougui Amougou
|
|
|
| align=left|
|align=left|
|-align=center
|Win
|25–0
|align=left| Mark Krence
| 
|
|
| align=left|
|align=left|
|-align=center
|Win
|24–0
|align=left| Rob Calloway
|
|
|
| align=left|
|align=left|
|-align=center
|Win
|23–0
|align=left| Roman Kracik
|
|
|
| align=left|
|align=left|
|-align=center
|Win
|22–0
|align=left| Laszlo Hubert
|
|
|
| align=left|
|align=left| 
|-align=center
|Win
|21–0
|align=left| Jozsef Nagy 	
|
|
|
| align=left|
|align=left|
|-align=center
|Win
|20–0
|align=left| Laszlo Hubert	
|
|
|
| align=left|
|align=left|
|-align=center
|Win
|19–0
|align=left| Jose Manuel Barreira
|
|
|
| align=left|
|align=left|
|-align=center
|Win
|18–0
|align=left| Istvan Varga
|
|
|
| align=left|
|align=left|
|-align=center
|Win
|17–0
|align=left| Armen Azizian
| 
|
|
| align=left|
|align=left|
|-align=center
|Win
|16–0
|align=left| Remigijus Ziausys
|
|
|
| align=left|
|align=left| 
|-align=center
|Win
|15–0
|align=left| Adrian Rajkai
|
|
|
| align=left|
|align=left|
|-align=center
|Win
|14–0
|align=left| Nabil Haciani
|
|
|
| align=left|
|align=left|
|-align=center
|Win
|13–0
|align=left| Oleksandr Subin  	
|
|
|
| align=left|
|align=left|
|-align=center
|Win
|12–0
|align=left| Mircea Telecan
|
|
|
| align=left|
|align=left|
|-align=center
|Win
|11–0
|align=left| Igor Marić
|
|
|
| align=left|
|align=left| 
|-align=center
|Win
|10–0
|align=left| Neil Stephens
|
|
|
| align=left|
|align=left|
|-align=center
|Win
|9–0
|align=left| Imrich Borka
|
|
|
| align=left|
|align=left|
|-align=center
|Win
|8–0
|align=left| Aleksejs Kosobokovs
|
|
|
| align=left| EWE-Arena, Oldenburg
|align=left|
|-align=center
|Win
|7–0
|align=left| Mohamed Ali Bouraoui
|
|
|
| align=left|
|align=left|
|-align=center
|Win
|6–0
|align=left| Ervin Slonka
|
|
|
| align=left|
|align=left|
|-align=center
|Win
|5–0
|align=left| Juraj Ondricko
|
|
|
| align=left|
|align=left|
|-align=center
|Win
|4–0
|align=left| Pavel Cirok
|
|
|
| align=left|
|align=left|
|-align=center
|Win
|3–0
|align=left| Ladislav Slezak
|
|
|
| align=left|
|align=left|
|-align=center
|Win
|2–0
|align=left| Ervin Slonka
|
|
|
| align=left|
|align=left|
|-align=center
|Win
|1–0
|align=left| Sylvester Petrović
|
| 
|
| align=left|
|align=left|
|-align=center

References

1984 births
Living people
People from Krynica-Zdrój
Sportspeople from Lesser Poland Voivodeship
Polish male boxers
Heavyweight boxers